The Superliga Femenina de Voleibol (SFM) is the top level of women's volleyball in Spain. The championship was founded in 1989. The administration of the league is carried out by the Real Federación Española de Voleibol. Formerly known as 1ª División de la Liga Nacional Femenina de Voleibol, and, since 1989 as the current name.

Competition format 
9 teams played in a two-round format. Upon completion of regular season, the top four teams play Championship's playoffs, while the bottom team is relegated to Superliga 2.

During regular season, a win by 3–0 or 3–1 means 3 points to winner team, while a 3–2 win, 2 points for winner team & 1 for loser team.

Championship playoffs is played to best of 3 games.

Champions by season

Titles by team

See also
Copa de la Reina de Voleibol
Supercopa de España de Voleibol Femenino

References

External links
Real Federación Española de Voleibol
  Spanish Superliga. women.volleybox.net 

 

 
Spain women1
1ªFemale
Spain
Women's sports leagues in Spain
Professional sports leagues in Spain